20 Bank Street (Heron Quays 1 (HQ1) or the Morgan Stanley Building) is a 14-storey office building in the Canary Wharf development in London, United Kingdom.

Completed in 2003, the building was designed by Skidmore, Owings & Merrill (SOM).

It is the European headquarters of Morgan Stanley, housing equity and fixed income trading floors, investment banking, technology and other support functions.

References

Office buildings in London
Buildings and structures in the London Borough of Tower Hamlets
Canary Wharf buildings
Skidmore, Owings & Merrill buildings
Office buildings completed in 2003